The 2012–13 season was St Johnstone's fourth consecutive season in the Scottish Premier League, having been promoted from the Scottish First Division at the end of the 2008–09 season. St Johnstone also competed in the Europa League, League Cup and the Scottish Cup.

Summary

Season
St Johnstone finished third in the Scottish Premier League. They reached the Second qualifying round of the Europa League, the Quarter-final of the League Cup and the fifth round of the Scottish Cup.

Results and fixtures

Pre season

Scottish Premier League

UEFA Europa League

Scottish League Cup

Scottish Cup

Player statistics

Captains

Squad
Last updated 19 May 2013

|}

Disciplinary record
Includes all competitive matches.
Last updated 19 May 2013

Team statistics

League table

Division summary

Transfers

Chris Millar initially turned down a new deal but later re-signed.

Players in

Players out

References 

St Johnstone F.C. seasons
St Johnstone
St Johnstone